Leng is the Mandarin pinyin and Wade–Giles romanization of the Chinese surname written  in Chinese character and Vietnamese surname written Lãnh. It is listed 377th in the Song dynasty classic text Hundred Family Surnames. As of 2008, it is the 246th most common surname in China, shared by 300,000 people.

Notable people
 Leng Bao (冷苞; 3rd century AD), Eastern Han dynasty general
 Yangqi Fanghui (杨岐方会; 992 – ca. 1049), lay surname Leng, founder of the Yangqi Sect of Chan Buddhism
 Leng Mei (冷枚, 17th–18th century), Qing dynasty painter
 Leng Yu (冷遹; 1882–1959), Vice Governor of Jiangsu province
 Leng Jiaji (冷家骥; 1899–1957), businessman and politician
 Leng Xin (冷欣; 1900–1987), Lieutenant General of the Republic of China
 Leng Pengfei (冷鹏飞; born 1933), PLA war hero and major general
 Leng Kuan (冷宽; born 1938), Vice Admiral of the PLA Navy
 Leng Rong (冷溶; born 1953), Vice President of the Chinese Academy of Social Sciences
 Leng Xueyan (冷雪艳 born 1972), runner, Asian Games gold medalist

References

Chinese-language surnames
Individual Chinese surnames